Luke Ford (born 1981) is an Australian actor.

Luke Ford is also the name of:

Luke Ford (blogger)  (born 1966), Australian-born American writer.
Luke Ford (rugby union) (born 1988), Welsh rugby union player